The Philadelphia Sound is a compilation album released by Chunksaah Records in 2002. It features four at the time up-and-coming hardcore punk bands from the Philadelphia, PA area each doing two songs. The bands are The Curse, Go! For The Throat, Knives Out and Paint It Black.

Track listing

External links
 Chunksaah Records page for The Philadelphia Sound

2002 compilation albums
Hardcore punk compilation albums
Chunksaah Records compilation albums
Regional music compilation albums
2002 EPs
Hardcore punk EPs
Chunksaah Records EPs